The River Camlin (Irish An Chamlinn - Crooked Pool) is a tributary of the River Shannon. Rising near Granard, it flows through Clonbroney, Ballinalee, Killoe and Longford Town before its two branch distributaries enter the Shannon.

The Camlin is navigable for part of its course. Its source is around the village of Abbeylara.

Fishing in the camlin can be good, it includes good stocks of pike, roach and is known to produce some nice brown trout from Lough Ree.

Perch, eel and rudd also live in the river.

External links 
 Longford.ie - Things to Do & See - Camlin River

Camlin
Tributaries of the River Shannon